{{Infobox university
 | name                   = King Abdulaziz University (KAU)
 | native_name            = جامعة الملك عبد العزيز
 | motto                  =  "Read: in the Name of your Lord" (Quran 96:1)|
 | latin_name             = 
 | image_name             = King Abdulaziz University (emblem).jpg
 | image_size             = 150px
 | type                   = Public research university
 | established            = 1967
 | endowment              = US$1 billion
 | administrative_staff   = 4,000
 | president              = Abdulrahman Obaid Al-Youbi
 | students               = 117,096 [55,576 Male and 61,520 Female students- Academic session 2022-2023] 
 | city                   = Jeddah
 | state                  = Makkah
 | country                = Saudi Arabia
 | coordinates            = 
 | campus                 = Both urban and rural
 | other_name             = KAU
 | website                = 
}}

King Abdulaziz University (KAU) is a public university in Jeddah, Saudi Arabia. With over 117,096 students in 2022, it is the largest university in the country. Located in south Jeddah, the university is the center of teaching and research of the city, comprising 24 faculties, 15 of these are located on the campus and 9 are off-campus. The university also offers some courses that are unavailable at any other universities in Saudi Arabia, such as marine science, meteorology, and astronomy. It was established in 1967 as a private university by a group of businessmen led by Muhammad Bakhashab and including author Hamza Bogary. In 1974, King Abdulaziz University was converted to a public university by a decision of the Saudi Cabinet under King Faisal's orders. 

It is ranked as the #1 university in the Middle East by U.S. News & World Report Best Global University Ranking and the #1 university in the Arab world by Times Higher Education. King Abdulaziz University has been placed in the top 200 universities in the world by four major ranking indices.

 History 
 Private university 

In the year 1964, the idea of establishing a private university in the city of Jeddah was originally put forward by Mohammed Ali Hafiz. In the same year, a preparatory committee of 6 members was formed, including Mohamed Ali Hafiz and Muhammad Abu Bakr Bakhashab. Shortly after, then-Crown Prince Faisal officially approved the idea. In 1965, the university's executive committee was formed. In 1966, the KAU held a competition to design their logo. The winning design was submitted by Abdul-Halim Radwi, a local artist from Jeddah.

In the year 1967, King Abdulaziz University was officially established as a private university, with goals to spread higher education in the western region of Saudi Arabia. Prior to this date, there were no higher-education institutions in Jeddah. These goals were met through efforts of high-ranking businessmen and notable Saudi figures; and additionally with the help of King Faisal's encouragement and financial support. The university started its first academic year in 1968, with a relatively small number of students (68 male - 30 female). In 1969, the first faculty was established (Faculty of Economics and Administration). In 1970, the Faculty of Arts and Humanities was established.
The university was named after King Abdulaziz, founder of Saudi Arabia.

 Public university (1974-present) 
In 1974, the Council of Ministers of Saudi Arabia decided to merge the university with the government; converting it to a public university. , it had almost 31,000 students, of which 28% are international.

The building's construction was designed by Bangladeshi-American architect Fazlur Rahman Khan.

In 2018, it was ranked the 1st Arab university by Times Higher Education due to very strong citation impact and highly international outlook. It also ranked no. 1 in percentage of total publications with international collaboration, according to US News rankings.

 Research programs 
Between 2004 and 2014, King Abdulaziz University enacted a program to attract the international community and has welcomed nearly 150 researches or various disciplines. The university has developed international research partners, including in Morocco where it has developed a joint lunar research program with the Astronomic Observatory of Oukaïmeden. The university has 13 different research centers, predominantly in the fields of medicine (medical genomes and osteoperosis), environment and energy, climate change, and desalination.

Founded in the 1970s by Sami Angawi, the research center on pilgrimage to Mecca (Hajj Research Center) conducts a series of works around the religious event, notably on the aspects of logistics surrounding the pilgrimage.

 Faculties 

 Faculty of Engineering 

 Electrical Engineering
 Computer Engineering
 Biomedical & Electrical Engineering
 Nuclear Engineering
 Aeronautical Engineering
 Chemical & Materials Engineering
 Civil Engineering
 Electrical & Computer Engineering
 Industrial Engineering
 Mining Engineering
 Production Engineering and Mechanical Systems Design
 Thermal Engineering and Desalination Technology

These programs are accredited by ABET as Substantially Equivalent Programs since 2003.

 Faculty of Economics and Administration 
The Faculty of Economics and Administration was the first college to be established in King Abdulaziz University, and until this day it is called "The Base of Founder's University," referring to the founder of the country.

 Department of Business Administration
 Department of Finance
 Department of Marketing
 Department of Human Resource Management
 Department of Accounting
 Department of Management Information Systems
 Department of Political Science
 Department of Health Administration
 Department of Public Administration
 Department of Economics
 Department of Law (defunct in 2012; separated into a new faculty)

In 2015, FEA received its fourth international accreditation, the AACSB making it one of the top business colleges in the middle east and across the world.

 Faculty of Law 
The Faculty of Law was established in 2012 as it segregated from Faculty of Economics and Administration.

 Public Law
 Private Law

 Other faculties 
 Faculty of Applied Medical Sciences
 Faculty of Medicine
 Faculty of Medicine at Rabigh
 Faculty of Arts and Humanities
 Faculty of Business
 Faculty of Education
 Faculty of Communication and Media
 Faculty of Computing and Information Technology
 Faculty of Design
 Faculty of Meteorology, Environment and Arid Land Agriculture
 Faculty of Nursing
 Faculty of Sciences 
 Faculty of Pharmacy
 Faculty of Dentistry
 Faculty of Earth Sciences
 Faculty of Health Sciences
 Faculty of Environmental Designs
 Faculty of Home Economics
 Faculty of Marine Sciences
 Faculty of Tourism
 Faculty of Maritime Studies

Ranking

King Abdulaziz University is ranked between 101 and 150 since 2020 by Academic Ranking of World Universities Furthermore, according to U.S. News & World Report Best Global University Ranking, King Abdulaziz University is ranked 44 in 2022. And according to QS World University Rankings, King Abdulaziz University is ranked at number 143 in 2021 in the world's top universities ranking by the London-based Quacquarelli Symonds (QS).

KAU has faced criticism for allegedly paying highly cited researchers from around the world to cite KAU as a "secondary academic affiliation" in order to boost their rankings. It also faced criticism for its high ranking by Times of Higher Education.

 Notable alumni 

 Magda Abu Ras, microbiologist and Deputy Director of the Saudi Environmental Society
 Nahed Taher, Saudi founder and chief executive officer of Gulf One Investment Bank, which has its headquarters in Bahrain. In 2006, Forbes magazine ranked Taher 72nd in the list of the 100 Most Powerful Women in the World.
 Osama bin Laden, founder and former leader of al Qaeda.
 Sulaiman Abdul Aziz Al Rajhi, Saudi billionaire economist, owner of Al Rajhi Bank, the 38th richest person in the world.
 Adel Fakeih, Saudi billionaire engineer and former mayor of Jeddah.
 Muna AbuSulayman, Saudi businesswoman. 
 Waleed Abulkhair, Saudi Arabian lawyer and human rights activist. 
 Tariq Alhomayed, journalist and former Editor-in-Chief of the Arabic-language newspaper Asharq Alawsat'', the youngest person to be appointed that position. 
 Samar Alsaggaf, first female Saudi anatomist 
 Tasneem Alsultan, Saudi-American photographer and artist, covering stories primarily for The New York Times and National Geographic 
 Yahya Al-Hamud, Saudi politician and Governor of Bareq
 Heba Elsewedy, Egyptian humanitarian
Saida Hagi-Dirie Herzi, Somali feminist writer 
 Mahfouz Marei Mubarak bin Mahfouz,  Saudi businessman and philanthropist 
 Saleh bin Nasser Al-Jasser, Saudi Minister of transport 
 Manal al-Sharif, Saudi women's rights activist.
 Abdallah Bin Bayyah, Muslim scholar, teaches in the university; Bin Bayyah holds a Mauritanian citizenship
 Amr Dabbagh, Saudi economist and businessman. Member of World Economic Forum and founder of Jeddah Economic Forum
 Shalimar Sharbatly, Saudi abstract artist
 Said Aqil Siradj, leader of Nahdlatul Ulama, world's largest Islamic organization in Indonesia

See also 

 List of universities in Saudi Arabia
 Imam Muhammad ibn Saud Islamic University
 Islamic University of Madinah
 King Saud University
 Umm al-Qura University

References

External links 
 
 
 KAU ranking from Times Higher Education World University Rankings.
 Faculty of Design and Arts

 
1967 establishments in Saudi Arabia
Educational institutions established in 1967
Education in Jeddah
Universities and colleges in Saudi Arabia
Fazlur Khan buildings